Kasai or Kasaï may refer to:

Places

Congo 

 Congo-Kasaï, one of the four large provinces of Belgian Congo
 Kasaï District, in the Kasai-Occidental province of the Democratic Republic of the Congo
 Kasai Province, one of the provinces of the Congo
 Kasaï region in the center of Congo

Japan 

 Kasai District, Hokkaido, a district of Hokkaido Prefecture, Japan
 Kasai Rinkai Park, in Edogawa, Tokyo
 Kasai Station, in the Kasai section of Edogawa, Tokyo, Japan
 Kasai, Hyōgo is a city in Hyōgo Prefecture, Japan

Other uses 

 Kangsabati River, or Kasai River in India
 Kasai procedure, a pediatric surgery commonly for biliary atresia
 Kasai (surname), a Japanese surname, lit. meaning "fire"

Congo 

 Air Kasaï, an airline in Barumbu, Kinshasa, Congo
 Compagnie du Kasai, a concession company of the Congo
 Kasai Allstars, a 25-piece musical collective based in Kinshasa, Congo
 Kasai River disaster, a passenger ferry capsized in Congo
 Kasai River, in Angola and the Congo

See also 

 Qassab, a Muslim ethnic group in north India and Pakistan
 Kassai (disambiguation)